Jack Cecil Collins (9 May 1925 – 4 January 1998) was an Australian rules footballer who played for the Fitzroy Football Club and Essendon Football Club in the Victorian Football League (VFL).

Collins, who was recruited locally to Fitzroy, kicked seven goals in a game against St Kilda at Brunswick Street in his debut season.
Jack Collins was a talented wingman who came from Fitzroy where he played 31 games from 1945 to 1949. Prior to that he was with Fitzroy Sub Districts.

He was speedy and his powerful left-foot kicks, usually delivered quickly after a swerving run, proved a source of drive.

He played 13 games in 1950 and was on the wing in the premiership win Grand Final. 

Collins didn't always see eye to eye with the Essendon hierarchy and there was disappointment when he didn't return in 1951.

He was cleared to Finley in New South Wales where he was captain-coach in 1951 and 1952 winning a premiership in the second year. He then played with Sorrento in 1953 and 1954 (Sorrento FC records show he played 12 games in 1955)and had half a season with Footscray Seconds in 1955.

His sons Daryl and Denis both played in the VFL during the 1970s. Daryl played one game for Footscray in 1974, and Dennis played a combined total of 147 games for Footscray, Carlton and Richmond (1972-1980).

References

Holmesby, Russell and Main, Jim (2007). The Encyclopedia of AFL Footballers. 7th ed. Melbourne: Bas Publishing.

External links

1925 births
Australian rules footballers from Victoria (Australia)
Fitzroy Football Club players
Essendon Football Club players
Essendon Football Club Premiership players
1998 deaths
One-time VFL/AFL Premiership players